Edwin Wallis-Smith (3 January 1908 – 14 March 1988) was a member of the Queensland Legislative Assembly.

Biography
Wallis-Smith was born at Maryborough, Queensland, the son of Edwin Alfred Wallis-Smith and his wife Eliza Jane (née Moore). He was educated at Maryborough Central State School and Maryborough Boys Grammar School and in 1937 joined the railway ambulance before becoming a locomotive driver in 1941. From 1941 to 1946 he joined the 2/15 Australian Field Ambulance where he was discharged at the rank of sergeant.

On 23 January 1937 he married Edna Elizabeth Langusch with whom he had one daughter.  He married for a second time in 1951, this time to Ruth Gibson. He died in Brisbane in March 1988.

Public life
Wallis-Smith, representing the Labor Party, won the seat of Tablelands at the 1963 Queensland state election. He held the seat until it was abolished before the 1972 state election and Wallis-Smith then moved to the electorate of Cook where he served until 1974 state election.

References

Members of the Queensland Legislative Assembly
1908 births
1988 deaths
Australian Labor Party members of the Parliament of Queensland
20th-century Australian politicians